Myriam Schropp (born 29 April 1966) is a retired German tennis player. She played on the WTA tour from 1982 to 1988. She represented West Germany at the 1984 and 1985 Fed Cup. She also competed at several Grand Slam tournaments and reached the semifinals of the 1984 Japan Open.

External links
 
 
 

1966 births
Living people
West German female tennis players